FC Adrenaline is an American professional indoor soccer team, founded in 2007.

The team played in the Premier Arena Soccer League from 2007–2010 as "Piasa FC". The club moved to the Professional Arena Soccer League (PASL) in 2010 as "Illinois Piasa" under head coach Jerry Lakin.

They originally played their home matches at the Soccer for Fun Arena in Granite City, Illinois. From 2011 through 2013, Piasa played their home games at The Sports Academy in Glen Carbon, Illinois. In July 2013, the Piasa announced that they would play the 2013–14 PASL season at The Field Sports Complex in Pontoon Beach, Illinois.

On July 22, 2013, the team announced that head coach Jason Norsic had resigned to pursue personal and family commitments. Doug Montroy was named as his replacement. On January 11, 2014, the team "parted ways" with Montroy and assistant coach Ed Rulo was named interim head coach for the remainder of the 2013–14 season.

In April 2014, The Field Sports Complex acquired all properties related to Illinois Piasa. The club will be an affiliate of St. Louis FC.

TFSC announced the rebranding of the club as FC Adrenaline in August 2014. The club will compete in the Premier Arena Soccer League during the 2014–15 season.

Year-by-year

Piasa name

The club's original name comes from the mythical Piasa Bird, a Native American legend from the Alton, Illinois, area just outside St. Louis. The legend says there is a giant bird that lives in the caves of the Mississippi River bluffs near Alton that kidnaps people, then proceeds to devour them in his lair.

References

External links
FC Adrenaline website

 
Premier Arena Soccer League teams
Indoor soccer clubs in the United States
Soccer clubs in Illinois
Madison County, Illinois
Association football clubs established in 2007
2007 establishments in Illinois